During the 1995 Australian Football League (AFL) season 111 Australian rules footballers made their AFL debut with 55 others playing their first game for a new club.

This was the  Fremantle Football Club's first season in the AFL, bringing the number of clubs participating to 16. 25 players made their AFL debut for Fremantle, more than double the number of debutantes in any other team during 1995.

Summary

AFL debuts

Change of AFL club

References
Full listing of players who made their AFL or club debut in 1995

Australian rules football records and statistics
Australian rules football-related lists
Debut